Maurice Lavigne (30 October 1930 – 19 September 2017) was a French racing cyclist. He rode in the 1958 Tour de France.

References

1930 births
2017 deaths
French male cyclists
Place of birth missing